Jandala is a village in the Samahni Valley in the Bhimber District of Azad Kashmir, in Pakistan, about 6–7 km from Bindi. It has a roadside bazaar among the cultivated fields. Apart from retail, the bazaar provides medical, banking and postal facilities. Jandala has High, Intermediate and Graduation  level private and state high schools and Colleges for  boys and girls. It is central hub of all neighbouring villages. It is beautiful with a scenic view surrounded by beautiful mountains. Nearby villages include Darhal, Barjun and Garhoon on the mountain, and Chadroon on the valley floor between Bindi and Jandala. The village is growing, and is becoming an employment hub for the area. The Most Famous thing of this area is a quality school and Colleges education in this category there are seven total schools and Colleges in Jandala Two State School one School and Three Colleges are private. Here the central educational competition.

Education

Government schools
Govt Boys High School Darhal Gaggan (boys)
Govt Girls School High School Thathi Jandala (girls)

Schools And Colleges
Innovator School System
Junaid Public Model School High Jandala (JPMHSJ).
Iftikhar Ideal Career College Jandalah.
Read Foundation College Jandalah.
Unique Model College JAndalah.
the islamic grammar school system jandala.
These colleges are competing for topping the area in results.

Junaid Public Model School High Jandala (JPMHSJ), formed in 1989–1990, The organisation aims to provide the best education and opportunities to children who are among the most vulnerable young people in Samahni Valley.

Iftikhar Ideal Career College Janalah (IICCJ), the only private college which provides quality education to the students coming from a number of villages. Students of IICCJ are serving in many fields i.e. army, medical, engineering, teaching and different IT fields. it is playing a vital role in progress of valley samahni AJK.Once this college topped in metric result of 2011 in girls. 

Read Foundation College is also playing a pivotal role in the progress of area.

Unique Model College started in 2014, it started on a very high note.

Govt School for Boys is also displaying good results under the supervision of efficient teachers.

the islamic grammar school system is a high school started in 2018

References

Populated places in Bhimber District